The 2014 Putrajaya ePrix, formally the 2014 FIA Formula E Ycapital Management Putrajaya ePrixis a Formula E motor race that was held on 22 November 2014 at the Putrajaya Street Circuit in Putrajaya, Malaysia. It was the second championship race of the single-seater, electrically powered racing car series' inaugural season.

Drivers Bruno Senna, Katherine Legge and Nick Heidfeld were awarded the "FanBoost" for the race.  The race was won by British driver Sam Bird (Virgin Racing)

Report

Background
The race had originally been scheduled to take place on 18 October. It was delayed until 22 November at the request of the Prime Minister of Malaysia, Najib Razak. The race start time was brought forward by two hours due to heavy rain being forecast.

Race
After Nicolas Prost had received a ten place grid penalty for causing a collision in Beijing, Oriol Servia started on pole position with Sam Bird second and Daniel Abt third. Abt made a poor start and fell back, while the whole field squeezed through the first series of tight corners without incident. At the end of the first lap, however, Katherine Legge made severe contact with Michela Cerruti and at the same time, Matthew Brabham was seen facing the wrong way in the hairpin. The safety car was brought out.

When the green flag showed at the start of the fifth lap, Bird managed to overtake Servia, which opened the door for Jarno Trulli and later Karun Chandhok to get by as well. On the eighth lap, Franck Montagny overtook Nick Heidfeld, simultaneously pushing his rival into the wall. This brought out a second safety car. Abt went into the pits, effectively extending his second stint to 21 laps. 

Racing continued on the twelfth lap. Bruno Senna was soon challenging Nelson Piquet Jr. for fifth, making use of his FanBoost, but hit the wall and damaged his suspension. Meanwhile, Bird continued to lap one to three seconds per lap quicker than everyone else, extending his lead on Trulli, Chandhok, and Servia. When the leaders made their pit stops, Abt reached first position, but with only fifty percent of his power remaining. Meanwhile, Trulli was given a drive-through penalty for exceeding his power usage. He still defended his position, however, handing Piquet the opportunity to overtake Lucas di Grassi. Piquet also tried to take third off of Trulli, but was pushed into the wall and had to retire.

On lap 24, Abt was still leading in front of Bird, Di Grassi, and Sébastien Buemi. Bird, at this point, was gaining three to five seconds per lap, because Abt was having to save energy, after having pitted very early in the race. He held the lead until the 28th lap, but eventually fell back to tenth. Senna, meanwhile, used his FanBoost to pass Prost for fourth, but crashed out in the last lap. Bird took the win, with Di Grassi and Buemi next to him on the podium.

Classification

Qualifying

Notes:
 - Nicolas Prost started with a ten place penalty for causing a collision in the previous race.
 - Jérôme d'Ambrosio was disqualified from the qualifying session for exceeding power usage limits.
 - Sebastian Buemi was disqualified from the qualifying session for an underweight car.

Race

Notes:
 – Three points for winning qualifying.
 – Two points for fastest lap.
 -Katherine Legge and Jarno Trulli have been given a drive through penalty converted into a 23-seconds time penalty for causing a collision.
 - Franck Montagny was disqualified from the race on 27 March 2015 after testing positive for a banned substance.
 - Nick Heidfeld was excluded from his nineteenth position finish for changing his car outside the permitted area during his pit stop. This meant his result at Putrajaya was not counted toward his championship points.

Standings after the race

Drivers' Championship standings

Teams' Championship standings

 Notes: Only the top five positions are included for both sets of standings.

References

|- style="text-align:center"
|width="35%"|Previous race:2014 Beijing ePrix
|width="30%"|FIA Formula E Championship2014–15 season
|width="35%"|Next race:2014 Punta del Este ePrix
|- style="text-align:center"
|width="35%"|Previous race:N/A
|width="30%"|Putrajaya ePrix
|width="35%"|Next race:2015 Putrajaya ePrix
|- style="text-align:center"

Putrajaya ePrix
Putrajaya ePrix
Putrajaya ePrix
Putrajaya ePrix